The Sagrinae are a subfamily of the leaf beetles, or Chrysomelidae.

Description 
Beetles of this subfamily are also known as "frog-legged beetles" or "kangaroo beetles". They are very distinctive due to their metafemora, or third pair of legs, which are distinctly larger than other femora and generally sport some type of ridge or tooth on the ventral side. It is theorized that the evolutionary function of the large metafemora is to hold the beetle on vegetation for feeding.

These beetles grow to be 1-2 inches in length, and display sexual dimorphism, with the males of the subfamilies being almost twice the size of the females. Males also have significantly larger metafemora than females.

Other identifying features include deep sutural stria, a prognathous head without a median sulcus and with cruciform grooves, a narrow pronotum, and commonly deeply indented eyes. They also have functional wings that aren't used often.

Most beetles of the subfamily display bright colors.

Distribution and Ecology 
This subfamily is found in Asia and has been observed in Malaysia, Java, Sumatra, Borneo, and the Philippines. It prefers dense tropical jungles for its habitat. There is fossil evidence that suggests these beetles lived in North America and Europe millions of years ago.

Reproduction 
There is not much known about reproduction and development in this subfamily, however species in the subfamily often sport large cocoons in the post-larval stage which are commonly found on vining plants.

The cocoons represent a phylogenetic relationship with a type of bacteria called Enterobacteriaceae because the bacteria play a role in the construction of the cocoons. This bacterium also functions as an intracellular symbiont with this subfamily of beetle, and lives in four large blind sacs at the larval foregut. The bacteria provide much needed nutrients throughout the beetle's life cycle.

Genera
 Ametalla Hope, 1840
 Atalasis Lacordaire, 1845
 Carpophagus MacLeay, 1827
 Coolgardica Blackburn, 1899
 Diaphanops Schönherr, 1845
 Duboulaia Baly, 1871
 Mecynodera Hope, 1840
 Megamerus MacLeay, 1827
 Neodiaphanops Blackburn, 1899
 Polyoptilus Germar, 1848
 Prionesthis Lacordaire, 1845 (synonym: Rhagiosoma Chapuis, 1878)
 Pseudotoxotus Blackburn, 1889
 Sagra Fabricius, 1792
 †Eosagra Haupt, 1950
 †Gallopsis Legalov, Kirejtshuk & Nel, 2019
 †Palaeatalasis Legalov, 2021
 †Pulchritudo Krell & Vitali, 2021

References

Chrysomelidae
Beetle subfamilies